The United Counties League (also known after its sponsor as the Uhlsport United Counties League) is an English football league covering Northamptonshire, Rutland and Bedfordshire and  most of Leicestershire as well as parts of Buckinghamshire, Cambridgeshire, Derbyshire, Lincolnshire, Norfolk, Nottinghamshire, Oxfordshire, Warwickshire and the West Midlands. It has a total of five divisions, three for first teams and two for reserve teams, but the reserves' divisions were merged into a single division for the 2013–14 season and remains so at present.

Clubs in the Premier Divisions are eligible to enter the FA Cup in the preliminary round stages. Those clubs in the league with floodlights are eligible for the FA Vase, and there are knockout cups for the Premier/Division One clubs and for the Reserve Divisions clubs.

History
The United Counties League was formed in 1895 as the Northamptonshire Junior League, dropping the 'Junior' one year later. It took its current name in 1934 as teams from other counties had long since been a part of the league. Over the years the UCL has 'united' teams from Northamptonshire, Rutland and Bedfordshire with those from parts of Buckinghamshire, Cambridgeshire, Huntingdonshire, Leicestershire, Lincolnshire and even Norfolk. Northampton Town joined the league in 1897 and became champions in their second season before moving up to the Southern League. They would become the league's first former member to reach the Football League in 1920. In 1900 Bedford Queens became the first club from outside the county to join the league.

The Football Association announced on 12 April 2021 that United Counties League would administer a new Step 5 division since the 2021–22 season after the scheduled National League System restructure had a one-season postponement due to the COVID-19 pandemic in England.

Current members

Premier Division North
The Premier Division North is at level 9 (step 5) of the National League System (NLS), feeding into the Northern Premier League Division One Midlands and East. There are currently 18 clubs in this division. The member clubs take part in cup competitions organised by the county FA to which they are affiliated and other cup competitions.

Premier Division South
The Premier Division South is also at level 9 (step 5) of the NLS, feeding into the Southern Football League Division One Central. There are currently 21 clubs in this division. The member clubs take part in cup competitions organised by the county FA to which they are affiliated and other cup competitions.

Division One
Division One is at level 10 (step 6) in the football pyramid above four smaller local leagues below the recognised NLS: Central Midlands League, Leicestershire Senior League, Lincolnshire League and Nottinghamshire Senior League. There are currently twenty-three clubs in this division.

Reserve Division
The membership of the Reserve Division is made up largely of the reserve teams of clubs in the Premier Division and Division One of the United Counties League. It has run as a single division since season 2013–14, and currently contains eighteen teams.

Recent champions

References

External links
United Counties League official website
United Counties League FA Full Time

 
9
Sports leagues established in 1895
1895 establishments in England